Maisonneuve Market is a public market in Montreal, Quebec, Canada. It is located at 4445 Ontario Street East in the borough of Mercier–Hochelaga-Maisonneuve.

It is bordered by Ontario Street to the south, William-David Street to the east, Place Gennevilliers Laliberté to the west and north. It can be reached from Pie-IX and Viau stations on the Montreal Metro's Green Line.

The original market was built in 1912 according to plans by architect . The present building opened in 1995, replacing umbrella shelters installed in 1980.

External links
Site officiel des marchés publics de Montréal

Commercial buildings in Montreal
Food markets in Canada
Mercier–Hochelaga-Maisonneuve
Montreal cuisine
Tourist attractions in Montreal